Four United States Navy ships have been named USS Gridley in honor of Charles Vernon Gridley.

, was the lead ship of her class of destroyers. She was launched in 1936 and struck in 1947
, was a  guided missile frigate, launched in 1961 and struck in 1994. In 1975, the Leahy class was redesignated as guided missile cruisers (CG), and she became CG-21.
Her keel was laid on 30 July 2004, christened 11 February 2006, and commissioned in Miami on 10 February 2007

United States Navy ship names